Port Townsend  is a city on the Quimper Peninsula in Jefferson County, Washington, United States. The population was 10,148 at the 2020 United States Census.
It is the county seat and only incorporated city of Jefferson County. In addition to its natural scenery at the northeast tip of the Olympic Peninsula, the city is known for the many Victorian buildings remaining from its late 19th-century heyday, numerous annual cultural events, and as a maritime center for independent boatbuilders and related industries and crafts. The Port Townsend Historic District is a U.S. National Historic Landmark District. It is also significantly drier than the surrounding region due to being in the rainshadow of the Olympic Mountains, receiving only  of rain per year.

History
The bay was originally named "Port Townshend" by Captain George Vancouver in 1792, for his friend the Marquis of Townshend. It was immediately recognized as a good safe harbor, although strong south winds and poor holding ground often make small-craft anchorage problematic off the town's waterfront.

The official European-American settlement of the city of the same name took place on April 24, 1851. American Indian tribes located in what is now Jefferson County in the mid-19th century included the Chimakum (or Chemakum), Hoh (a group of the Quileute), Klallam (or Clallam), Quinault, and Twana (the Kilcid band — Anglicized as "Quilcene").

Port Townsend is called the "City of Dreams" because of the early speculation that the city would be the largest harbor on the west coast of the United States. Guarding the gate of Puget Sound, it would become known by its other nickname, the "Key City," a title that remains to this day.

By the late 19th century, Port Townsend was a well-known seaport, very active and banking on the future. Many homes and buildings were built during that time, with most of the architecture ornate Victorian. During this period, in 1888, the Port Townsend Police Department was established.

Railroads were built to reach more areas in the 1870s–1890s, and Port Townsend was to be the northwest extension of the rail lines. Its port was large and frequented by overseas vessels, so shipping of goods and timber from the area was a major part of the economy. Many of the buildings were built on the speculation that Port Townsend would become a booming shipping port and major city. When the depression hit, those plans lost the capital to continue and rail lines ended on the east side of Puget Sound, mainly in Tumwater, Tacoma, and Seattle. With the other Puget Sound ports growing in size, Port Townsend saw a rapid decline in population when the Northern Pacific Railroad failed to connect the city to the eastern Puget Sound city of Tacoma. By the late 1890s, the boom was over. Without the railroad to spur economic growth, the town shrank and investors looked elsewhere to make a good return. (The Milwaukee Road built a short spur to the pulpmill and barged cars over from Anacortes.)

Over the decades that followed, Port Townsend maintained its economic stability in a variety of ways, including the development of artillery fortifications at Fort Worden. Many people left the area, and many buildings were abandoned. Port Townsend's economy was very weak until the 1920s, when a paper mill was built on the edge of the town. The bay is now home to Naval Magazine Indian Island, the US Navy's primary munitions-handling dock on the Pacific coast.

Since the 1970s new residents, including many retirees, have moved to town. The waterfront retail district has restaurants, services, and tourist destinations. Since 1999, the city has had an annual international film festival in September. Other cultural programming, some at Fort Worden, now a state park, includes a Wooden Boat Festival, writers' conference, playwrighting festival, and blues and jazz festivals, in addition to music, dance, and live theater performances. The town has two independent movie theaters, both upgraded by 2014 to handle digital film.

Recognition of historic status

Because of the speed at which the economy declined in the 1890s and the lack of any industry to replace it, very few of the Victorian buildings were torn down or built over in the intervening period. They were essentially preserved for nearly 100 years, when the value of protecting them was appreciated and fostered. Unlike most cities in the Pacific Northwest that were ravaged by natural and man-made disasters such as fire and earthquakes, prominent examples of public, private and business buildings from nearly every period of Port Townsend's history have survived to the present day.

The Port Townsend Historic District, an area including many Victorian-era buildings, was listed on the National Register of Historic Places in 1976. It was designated a National Historic Landmark in 1977.

Geography

Port Townsend is located at  (48.116514, -122.775254), on the Quimper Peninsula which extends out of the extreme northeastern end of the Olympic Peninsula, on the north end of a large, semi-protected bay. Port Townsend is adjacent to the Admiralty Inlet and a trio of state parks built on retired artillery installations (Fort Worden, Fort Casey, and Fort Flagler). The city and its surroundings are well-treed, with large Douglas fir dominant over many other tree species in the remaining wooded areas.

Climate
Port Townsend has a moderate Mediterranean climate with damp, chilly (though not severe) winters and warm, dry summers. It lies in the Olympic rain shadow and receives an average of only  annual precipitation. However, the environment is not as dry as the mean yearly total would suggest; cool breezes and fog from the Juan de Fuca Strait provide a comfortable level of humidity.

Demographics

2010 census
As of the census of 2010, there were 9,113 people, 4,544 households, and 2,322 families residing in the city. The racial makeup of the city was 92.4% White, 0.5% African American, 1.1% Native American, 1.7% Asian, 0.3% Pacific Islander, 0.8% from other races, and 3.1% from two or more races. Hispanic or Latino people of any race were 3.3% of the population.

There were 4,544 households, of which 19.2% had children under the age of 18 living with them, 38.9% were married couples living together, 9.4% had a female householder with no husband present, 2.8% had a male householder with no wife present, and 48.9% were non-families. 39.6% of all households were made up of individuals, and 18% had someone living alone who was 65 years of age or older. The average household size was 1.98 and the average family size was 2.60.

The median age in the city was 53 years. 16.1% of residents were under the age of 18; 5.3% were between the ages of 18 and 24; 17.4% were from 25 to 44; 36.7% were from 45 to 64; and 24.5% were 65 years of age or older. The gender makeup of the city was 46.0% male and 54.0% female.

2000 census
According to the 2000 census, there were 8,334 people, 3,917 households and 2,201 families residing in the city. The population density was 1,191.8 people per square mile (460.3/km2). There were 4,250 housing units at an average density of 607.8 per square mile (234.8/km2). The racial makeup of the city was 93.27% White, 0.58% African American, 1.25% Native American, 1.27% Asian, 0.23% Pacific Islander, 0.89% from other races, and 2.52% from two or more races. Hispanic or Latino people of any race were 2.30% of the population.

There were 3,917 households, of which 23.3% had children under the age of 18 living with them, 42.4% were married couples living together, 11.2% had a female householder with no husband present, and 43.8% were non-families. 36.3% of all households were made up of individuals, and 16.2% had someone living alone who was 65 years of age or older. The average household size was 2.09 and the average family size was 2.67. 205 of these households were on the waiting list of the Housing Choice Voucher Program as of 2003.

Age distribution was 19.6% under the age of 18, 5.5% from 18 to 24, 21.8% from 25 to 44, 32.3% from 45 to 64, and 20.8% who were 65 years of age or older. The median age was 47 years. For every 100 females, there were 85.5 males. For every 100 females age 18 and over, there were 82.6 males.

The median household income was $34,536, and the median family income was $47,027. Males had a median income of $38,013 versus $27,753 for females. The per capita income for the city was $22,395. About 8.9% of families and 14.0% of the population were below the poverty line, including 19.0% of those under age 18 and 10.2% of those age 65 or over.

Economy
The largest private employer is the Port Townsend Paper Mill. The largest employer overall (private and public) is Jefferson Healthcare, which operates Jefferson Healthcare Hospital. Major industries include maritime trades, manufacturing, tourism, and timber.

Arts and culture

The sign entering town names Port Townsend a "Victorian Seaport and Arts Community."

Art and music
Reflecting the numerous artists in the area, downtown has many galleries and two artists' collectives. The nonprofit Northwind Art is located in the 1885 Waterman & Katz Building downtown. There is a monthly Art Walk, and a plethora of classes, workshops, and training are available locally. 

Fort Worden State Park is home to a number of cultural organizations and venues. Centrum is a culture and arts organization that hosts a multitude of concerts, festivals, and workshops. These include "Fiddle Tunes", blues, jazz, voice, chamber music, and more. Copper Canyon Press, the poetry press, is located there, as are facilities for Goddard College, Madrona Mindbody Institute, Peninsula College, and the Port Townsend School of Woodworking. In late October and November 1981, Fort Worden was the central filming location for the 1982 movie An Officer And A Gentleman starring Richard Gere. Starting in August 2019, Fort Worden began hosting a music festival called "Thing", created by Adam Zacks.

Port Townsend has two dance schools for children and adults. The city is also home to Port Townsend Symphony Orchestra.

Festivals and events
Port Townsend is host to several annual events such as the Port Townsend Wooden Boat festival, Kinetic Skulpture Race  (since 1983), the Rhododendron Festival, Port Townsend Film Festival, and the annual blues and jazz festival.

Boating and maritime life are central elements in this port town, with regattas, weekly races, and a multitude of recreational opportunities, including annual boating events such as the Race to Alaska and Seventy48. The marine trades industry is an anchor economic driver for the community, with highly skilled, world-renowned tradespeople. The port is home to many classic wooden boats, and gets visits from owners of others seeking repairs. 

Since 1999, Port Townsend has held its annual international film festival in September. The Rose Theatre downtown shows contemporary American and foreign films. The Uptown Theater shows family-oriented films, and a nearby drive-in theater is open during the summer. Key City Public Theatre is the local playhouse presenting many award-winning productions and Shakespeare in the Park in the summer.

Historical buildings and sites

Port Townsend is noted for its Victorian houses and significant historical buildings. The city has more than a dozen large, well-preserved buildings, including the Port Townsend Public Library (a 1913 Carnegie Library), the Federal Building (now commonly known as the city's post office), the Rose Theatre, and the Elks Lodge, which now houses Silverwater Cafe. Fort Worden, now a state park, has retained some of its pre-World War I architecture built when it was a military facility. Buildings have been adapted for other uses, including the publicly available Olympic Youth Hostel, which closed in 2011. The Jefferson County Courthouse is in a Romanesque architectural style, as popularized by Henry Hobson Richardson, with a 125-foot bell tower.

In 1976, the Downtown waterfront and parts of Uptown were designated a Registered Historic District. Later, Fort Worden (now part of Fort Worden State Park) and the City of Port Townsend were designated National Historic Landmarks.

The Bell Tower on the bluff above downtown is one of two known towers of this type in the United States. It was used from 1890 to the 1940s to call volunteer firefighters. It was restored in 2003 by the Jefferson County Historical Society. The second bell tower is located in Helena, Montana, and was also used for fire alarms during the late 19th century.

Tourism
A history museum is located downtown and the Port Townsend Aero Museum is located at the local airport. The Northwest Maritime Center is located on the waterfront, and features a wooden boat shop. The Port Townsend Marine Science Center has facilities at Fort Worden State Park.

Environment and ecology
A non-binding resolution was passed by the city council in 2022 declaring that a local sub-group of killer whales, known as the Southern resident orcas, have rights of nature and should be protected due to the orca's significant "cultural, spiritual, and economic" value to the state and its citizens. The U.S. government has exclusive jurisdiction more than three miles offshore.

Education
Public education in the city is administered by Port Townsend School District, which includes Salish Coast Elementary School, Blue Heron Middle School and Port Townsend High School.

Private schools in the city include Olympic Range Carden Academy, and Swan School.

Adult education opportunities are available at Fort Worden through Goddard College, Peninsula College, Centrum Foundation, Port Townsend School of the Arts, and the Port Townsend School of Woodworking.

Infrastructure
State Route 20 runs southwest from Port Townsend  to U.S. Route 101 at Discovery Bay. In addition to road links, the city is accessible via the Washington State Ferries system, which has a route from Port Townsend to Coupeville on Whidbey Island.

Electric vehicle charging stations are located at the Food Coop (414 Kearney Street), the Northwest Maritime Center (431 Water Street) and at Safeway (442 W Sims Way)

Media
 Port Townsend & Jefferson County Leader
 Peninsula Daily News—Port Townsend/Jefferson County Edition
 Liberty Magazine (founded by R. W. Bradford in 1987)
 Radio station KPTZ Radio Port Townsend, 91.9FM
 Radio station KROH Radio of Hope, 91.1FM

Notable people

  Annie Proulx, writer
 Daniel James Brown, author
 Luke Burbank, radio host
 Frank Herbert, author of Dune
 Marvin G. Shields, Medal of Honor, U.S. Navy, Vietnam War
 Jim Whittaker, mountaineer and first American to summit Mount Everest

Sister city
Port Townsend is twinned with Ichikawa, Hyōgo, Japan. A group of local students participate in an exchange with this city during the summer.

According to the Washington State Lieutenant Governor's website, Port Townsend also has a sister city relationship with Jalapa, Nicaragua, though the city's website does not reflect this.

See also

Pacific Wharf Company

References

Further reading

External links

 
 PTCheckList provides Port Townsend event listings and a directory of places and services  
 City of Port Townsend official website

 Naval Magazine Indian Island 
 University of Washington Libraries Digital Collections – The Pacific Northwest Olympic Peninsula Community Museum
 Jefferson County Historical Society Research Center

 
Cities in Washington (state)
County seats in Washington (state)
Populated places on Puget Sound
Cities in Jefferson County, Washington